Melik Brown (born September 14, 1984) is a professional American football fullback who is currently a free agent.

College career
Brown was a four-year starter at the University of North Carolina, where he played linebacker and defensive end. He set the defensive lineman squat record of 655 lbs.

Professional career
He was signed by the South Jersey Lynx as a street free agent in 2007.
Brown has also played for the Central Penn Piranha and the BC Lions.
In 2009, Brown started playing indoor football, when he joined the Harrisburg Stampede of the American Indoor Football Association (AIFA). The Stampede struggled that season, leading Brown to sign with the Baltimore Mariners the following season.
On February 11, 2011, Brown signed with the Philadelphia Soul of the Arena Football League (AFL). He was released two months later. He signed with the Southern Indoor Football League's Trenton Steel on April 26, 2011. Brown spent the next two years on and off with the Soul.
On January 6, 2014, Brown signed with the Trenton Freedom of the Professional Indoor Football League (PIFL). In 2015, Brown was twice named to the First Team All-PIFL as both a fullback and Iron-man.

References

External links
Philadelphia Soul bio
BC Lions bio

1984 births
Living people
Players of American football from Camden, New Jersey
American players of Canadian football
American football defensive linemen
Canadian football defensive linemen
North Carolina Tar Heels football players
BC Lions players
Philadelphia Soul players
Harrisburg Stampede players
Trenton Freedom players